Geoffrey Reginald Mason (6 May 1930 – 5 June 2018) was an Australian rules footballer who played with Melbourne in the Victorian Football League (VFL).

Notes

External links 

1930 births
2018 deaths
Australian rules footballers from Victoria (Australia)
Melbourne Football Club players